Alissa Margaret Weaver is an American oncologist. In 2017, she was promoted to the Cornelius Vanderbilt Endowed Chair of Cell and Developmental Biology and Pathology, Microbiology and Immunology at the Vanderbilt University School of Medicine.

Early life and education
Weaver completed her Bachelor of Arts degree in political science and Bachelor of Science degree in biology from Stanford University. She then enrolled in medical school at the University of Virginia School of Medicine but also wanted to have the formal training of getting a PhD so she completed her doctoral degree at the same institution. In 2000, Weaver was a postdoctoral research fellow at the Howard Hughes Medical Institute.

Career
In 2003, Weaver accepted a faculty position at the Vanderbilt University School of Medicine and focused her research on all aspects of extracellular vesicles. As an associate professor of Cancer Biology, Weaver and her colleagues in the Vanderbilt-Ingram Cancer Center and the Department of Biomedical Informatics used computational modeling and experimental studies to identify how proteins PI3-kinase and PKC-alpha worked together. In 2013, she found that invadopodia and exosomes, two features of invasive cancer cells, were linked together and act as docking and secretion sites for exosomes. As a result of her academic research, Weaver was elected to serve on the Association of American Medical Colleges Council of Faculty and Academic Societies and Vanderbilt's Basic Science Research Advisory Committee.

In 2016, Weaver was one of nine Vanderbilt faculty members elected fellows of the American Association for the Advancement of Science. She was recognized for her "distinguished contributions to the field of cancer cell biology, particularly the role of the actin cytoskeleton and membrane trafficking machineries in promoting cancer invasion." The following year, she was promoted to the Cornelius Vanderbilt Endowed Chair at the Vanderbilt University School of Medicine.

During the COVID-19 pandemic, Weaver was the co-recipient of a $9 million five-year grant to study extracellular RNA in colorectal cancer from the National Cancer Institute. The grant would "support multiple projects that aim to define fundamental biological principles about extracellular RNA signaling and the development and aggressiveness of colorectal cancer, the second leading cause of cancer death in the United States." Later that year, she received another grant to support biomanufacturing of new drug delivery technologies.

References

External links

Living people
American oncologists
Women oncologists
Stanford University alumni
University of Virginia School of Medicine alumni
Vanderbilt University faculty
Fellows of the American Association for the Advancement of Science
Year of birth missing (living people)